John Anderson Spence Black (17 June 1914 – 1992) was a Scottish footballer who played for Third Lanark, Alloa Athletic, Airdrie, Morton, Dumbarton and Chelmsford City. Black died in Glasgow, Scotland in 1992 at the age of 78.

References

1914 births
1992 deaths
Scottish footballers
Third Lanark A.C. players
Alloa Athletic F.C. players
Airdrieonians F.C. (1878) players
Greenock Morton F.C. players
Dumbarton F.C. players
Chelmsford City F.C. players
Scottish Football League players
Glasgow Perthshire F.C. players
Association football central defenders